Labuta Rural LLG is a local-level government (LLG) of Morobe Province, Papua New Guinea.

Wards
01. Tamigidu
02. Boac
03. Buingim
04. Ee'c
05. Wideru
06. Bukawa (Bukawa language speakers)
07. Mundala
08. Yambo
09. Buhalu
10. Waganluhu
11. Apo
12. Musom/Tale (Musom language speakers)
13. Situm
14. Momolili

References

Local-level governments of Morobe Province